Myrmecocystus mimicus is a North American species of ant in the genus Myrmecocystus. The species is widely distributed, from Kansas south to Texas and Mexico, and west to California.

References

External links

Formicinae
Hymenoptera of North America
Insects of Mexico
Insects of the United States
Insects described in 1908
Taxa named by William Morton Wheeler